The Smiths Falls Bears are a Junior "A" ice hockey team from Smiths Falls, Ontario, Canada.  They are a part of the Central Canada Hockey League.  The team was an original member of the league, but then left Smiths Falls in 1976.  The team then rejoined the league in 1985, and later had a short two-year stint in Lanark before returning to Smiths Falls.

History
The origins of the Smiths Falls Bears trace back to when the Central Junior Hockey League was formed in 1961 under the direction of the Montreal Canadiens. The Bears are one of the oldest franchises in Canadian Junior A hockey, despite a 9-year leave of absence from 1976 to 1985. From 2000 to 2002 the team was known as the Lanark Thunder and played out of Perth, Ontario before the franchise was suspended. As a result, the Smiths Falls Bears were re-admitted to the league as an expansion team for 2002-03 and held an expansion draft.

The Bears inaugural season saw members wear maroon and white - identical colours of the American Hockey League's Hershey Bears. In 1985, the Bears returned to the league wearing the colours black, gold, and white - identical to the Pittsburgh Penguins uniforms in the 1980s. In the early 1990s, the Bears went back to their original colours of maroon and white, but with grey. In 1998, the Bears changed their colours to teal and black, which being such a departure from earlier styles, confused CJHL supporters around the league.

The Bears won their first Art Bogart Cup in 1965 as Central Junior Hockey League champions. The Bears won back-to-back CJHL championships in 1974 and 1975. In 1976, the Bears took a leave of absence from the league, returning in 1985.

In February 2000, a dressing room fire at the Smiths Falls Memorial Centre destroyed almost all of the team's equipment. The equipment was replaced through donations and charities and Bears were able to finish the 1999-00 season. The following summer, the Bears announced their relocation to nearby Lanark, Ontario. Assuming the name of the Lanark Thunder, the owner promised to draw attendance at the Perth Community Arena for the 2000-01 season. While the inaugural season of the Thunder drew satisfactory attendance, it dropped dramatically during the following season and nearly being unable to participate in the playoffs at the conclusion of the 2001-02 season and having to give up their playoff spot to the second-last team (Brockville). The Thunder played the Nepean Raiders in the first round and lost the series 4-0. Immediately afterwards, the team was suspended allowing the original franchise to be re-admitted as an expansion team.

The Smiths Falls Bears missed the playoffs in their first three years returning from Lanark. In December 2004, a new head coach Bill Bowker was assigned to turn the team around. The Bears had won just a single game before January 2005, which resulted in heavy criticism by fans and media alike. But the coaching change paid off as the Bears made the playoffs for the next four years. Their best post-Lanark Thunder season was 2007-08, when the Bears appeared in the CJHL finals after knocking off arch-rivals Brockville Braves in 6 games to compete against arch-rivals Pembroke Lumber Kings. The Lumber Kings won the finals in 5 games. In July 2008, three Bears were chosen in the NHL Draft. Mike Bergin (by the Dallas Stars); Nicholas Tremblay (by the Boston Bruins); and Mark Borowiecki (by the Ottawa Senators). They became the first trio of players from the same CJHL club to be chosen in the NHL Draft. Mark Borowiecki left Clarkson University after the 2010-11 season as he signed a 2-year minor league contract with the Ottawa Senators minor league affiliate the Binghamton Senators.

On February 27, 2010, the Smiths Falls Bears played their final game at the Smiths Falls Memorial Centre. During the off-season, the arena was torn down and replaced with a new one on exactly the same premises. After the 2010-11 season the Bears released their longtime head coach and manager Bill Bowker. Bowker was replaced with Ottawa 67's former assistant coach (and assistant coach of the Bears during the 2010-11 season) Mark Grady.

In 2016, the Smiths Falls Bears and the Town of Smiths Falls was awarded the 2018 Fred Page Cup. The Bears have the newest and most-suitable facility in the league.

Season-by-Season record
Note: GP = Games Played, W = Wins, L = Losses, T = Ties, OTL = Overtime Losses, GF = Goals for, GA = Goals against

Championships
CJHL Bogart Cup Championships: 1965, 1972, 1974, 1975
Eastern Canadian Fred Page Cup Championships: None
CJAHL Royal Bank Cup Championships: None

Notable alumni
Fred Brathwaite
Joe DiPenta
Rob Dopson
Randy Pierce
Steve Poapst
Ken Richardson
Billy Smith
Steve Valiquette
Ron Ward
Jason York
Rod Zaine
Mark Borowiecki
Zachary Senyshyn

External links
Smiths Falls Bears Website

Central Canada Hockey League teams
Ice hockey clubs established in 1961